Marie-Jeanne Riccoboni (25 October 1713 in Paris - 7 December 1792 in Paris), whose maiden name was Laboras de Mézières, was a French actress and novelist.

Early years

She was born in Paris in 1713.

Career
In 1735, she married Antoine François Riccoboni, a comedian and dramatist, from whom she soon separated. She herself was an actress and had moderate success on the stage.

Madame Riccoboni's work is among the most eminent examples of the "sensibility" novel; among the parallels cited in English literature are works by Laurence Sterne and Samuel Richardson. A still nearer parallel may be found in the work of Henry Mackenzie. Her works were also described as "letter novel" containing the negotiations of femininity, desire, and ambition. She has influenced other writers, including Pierre Choderlos de Laclos and his literary aesthetics.

She obtained a small pension from the crown, but the Revolution deprived her of it, and she died in Paris on 7 December 1792 in great poverty.

Writer
Riccoboni's first novel was Les Lettres de Mistris Fanni Butlerd (1757), which explored the functional exclusion of women from the public sphere. She is also noted for publishing Les Lettres de Juliette Catesby in 1759. Its translation by Frances Brooke into English the following year became an immediate success in England so that it went through six editions. Apart from authoring the works listed below, Riccoboni was the editor of a periodical, L'Abeille (1761), wrote a novel (1762) on the subject of Fielding's Amelia, and supplied in 1765 a continuation (but not the conclusion sometimes erroneously ascribed to her) of Marivaux's unfinished Marianne. Riccoboni also corresponded with Pierre Choderlos de Laclos, author of Les Liaisons Dangeureuses, as well as David Hume and the theater celebrity David Garrick (see J.C. Nicholls, ed. Madame Riccoboni’s letters to David Hume, David Garrick, and Sir Robert Liston : 1764-1783, Oxford: The Voltaire Foundation, 1976). Her letters to these personalities, including the diplomat Robert Liston, provided an account of life in France during the latter part of the eighteenth century. 

Some of her better known works are:
Lettres de mistriss Fanni Butlerd (1757)
the remarkable Histoire du marquis de Cressy (1758)
Les Lettres de Juliette Catesby (1759), an epistolary novel appreciated by Voltaire and translated into English by Frances Brooke in 1760
l'Histoire d'Ernestine (1765), which La Harpe thought her masterpiece
three series of Lettres in the names of:
Adelaide de Dammartin (comtesse de Sancerre) (2 vol., 1766)
Elizabeth Sophie de Valliere (2 vol., 1772)
Milord Rivers (2 vol., 1776)

References

Sources

Further reading
For a more complete survey of literature on Mme Riccoboni, see the bibliography by the Association Riccoboni.
 Jan Herman, Kris Peeters and Paul Pelckmans, eds. Mme Riccoboni, romancière, épistolière, traductrice, colloque de l'université de Louvain-Anvers (2006) Louvain; Paris: Dudley, 2007.
 Annie Cointre, Florence Lautel-Ribstein, Annie Rivara, eds. La traduction du discours amoureux (1660-1830). Metz: CETT, 2006. (Two papers pertain to Riccoboni: Jan Herman and Beatrijs Vanacker, 'Madame Riccoboni travestie par Casanova : de nouveaux habits pour Juliette Catesby', and Raeleen Chai-Elsholz, 'Textual Allusions and Narrative Voice in the Lettres de Milady Juliette Catesby and its English Translation'.)
 Brigitte Diaz and Jurgen Siess, eds. L'épistolaire au féminin, correspondances de femmes, colloque de Cerisy-la-Salle (2003). Presses universitaires de Caen, 2006.
 Suzan Van Dijk, 'Fictions revues et corrigées : Marie-Jeanne Riccoboni en face de la critique contemporaine', in Journalisme et fiction au 18e siècle, eds. Malcolm Cook and Annie Jourdan. Bern: Peter Lang, 1999.
 Susan Sniader Lanser, Fictions of Authority. Women Writers and Narrative Voice. Ithaca, NY: Cornell University Press, 1992. (See esp. chapter 2: 'The Rise of the Novel, The Fall of the Voice: Juliette Catesby's Silencing', and chapter 3: 'In a Class by Herself: Self-Silencing in Riccoboni's Abeille'''.)
 Elizabeth Heckendorn Cook, 'Going Public: The Letter and the Contract in Fanni Butlerd', Eighteenth-Century Studies 24.1 (Fall 1990): 21-45.
 Joan Hinde Stewart, 'Sex, Text, and Exchange: Lettres neuchâteloises and Lettres de Milady Juliette Catesby', Eighteenth-Century Life 13.1 (Feb. 1989): 60-68.
 Andrée Demay, Marie-Jeanne Riccoboni : ou De la pensée féministe chez une romancière du XVIIIe siècle. Paris: La Pensée Universelle, 1977.
 Joan Hinde Stewart, The Novels of Mme Riccoboni. Chapel Hill: North Carolina Studies in the Romance Languages and Literatures, 1976.
 Kenneth R. Umland, Madame Riccoboni et Diderot : un débat sur l’art théâtral au dix-huitième siècle. [s.l.s.n.], 1975.
 Emily A. Crosby, Une romancière oubliée, Mme Riccoboni : sa vie, ses œuvres, sa place dans la littérature anglaise et française du XVIIIe siècle''. Paris: F. Rieder, 1924; Geneva: Slatkine Reprints, 1970.

External links
 
 
 
 Association Riccoboni, biographical details, mainly in French.

1714 births
1792 deaths
Actresses from Paris
18th-century French actresses
French stage actresses
18th-century French writers
18th-century French women writers
18th-century French dramatists and playwrights
18th-century French novelists
French feminist writers
French women novelists
18th-century letter writers